Cece or CeCe may refer to:
Cece, Hungary, a village in Fejér county, Hungary
CeCe (album), a 2011 album by CeCe Peniston
Cece McStuffins, the adopted doll of Doc McStuffins
Common Extensible Cryogenic Engine, a liquid-fuel rocket engine

People
Cece Carlucci (1917–2008), American baseball umpire
CeCe Peniston (born 1969), American gospel and dance music singer
Cece Telfer, American transgender athlete
CeCe Winans  (born 1964), American gospel music singer

Characters
 CeCe Drake , a character from the TV show Pretty Little Liars
 Cece (New Girl), a character from the television sitcom New Girl
 Cecelia "CeCe" Halpert, a character from The Office
CeCe Matney, a character from the Netflix TV show Sweet Magnolias

See also 
 CC (disambiguation)